Abdollahabad or Abbdollahabad may refer to:

East Azerbaijan Province
Abdollahabad, East Azerbaijan, a village in Sarab County

Fars Province
Abdollahabad, Fars, a village in Arsanjan County

Hamadan Province
Abdollahabad, Hamadan, a village in Kabudarahang County

Hormozgan Province
Abdollahabad, Hormozgan, a village in Minab County

Kerman Province
Abdollahabad, Anbarabad, a village in Anbarabad County
Abdollahabad, Bardsir, a village in Bardsir County
Abdollahabad 1, a village in Bardsir County
Abdollahabad 2, a village in Bardsir County
Abdollahabad, Narmashir, a village in Narmashir County
Abdollahabad, Rafsanjan, a village in Rafsanjan County
Abdollahabad, Rudbar-e Jonubi, a village in Rudbar-e Jonubi County
Abdollahabad, Shahr-e Babak, a village in Shahr-e Babak County
Abdollahabad, Zarand, a village in Zarand County

Mazandaran Province
Abdollahabad, Mahmudabad, a village in Mahmudabad County
Abdollahabad, Nur, a village in Nur County
Abdollahabad, Tonekabon, a village in Tonekabon County

North Khorasan Province
Abdollahabad, Garmkhan, North Khorasan Province
Abdollahabad, Raz and Jargalan, North Khorasan Province

Qom Province
Abdollahabad, Qom

Razavi Khorasan Province
Abdollahabad, Bardaskan, Razavi Khorasan Province
Abdollahabad, Firuzeh, Razavi Khorasan Province
Abdollahabad, Khoshab, Razavi Khorasan Province
Abdollahabad, Mahvelat, Razavi Khorasan Province
Abdollahabad, Mashhad, Razavi Khorasann Province
Abdollahabad, Nishapur, Razavi Khorasann Province

Semnan Province
Abdollahabad, Damghan, in Damghan County
Abdollahabad, Amirabad, in Damghan County
Abdollahabad-e Bala, in Semnan County

Tehran Province
Abdollahabad, Tehran
Abdollahabad-e Ojaq, Tehran Province

West Azerbaijan Province
Abdollahabad, Bukan, a village in Bukan County
Abdollahabad, Mahabad, a village in Mahabad County

Yazd Province
Abdollahabad, Yazd, a village in Mehriz County